La Couture is a commune in the Vendée department in the Pays de la Loire region in western France.

Geography
The river Lay forms most of the commune's eastern and south-western borders.

See also
Communes of the Vendée department

References

Communes of Vendée